The 2014 Swindon Borough Council election took place on 22 May 2014 to elect members of Swindon Borough Council in England. This was on the same day as other local elections. The Conservatives gained 1 seat to retain control of the council.

Overall Result

|-bgcolor=#F6F6F6
| colspan=2 style="text-align: right; margin-right: 1em" | Total
| style="text-align: right;" | 57
| colspan=5 |
| style="text-align: right;" | 
| style="text-align: right;" | 
|-

Ward Elections

The results of the election are:

Blunsdon & Highworth Ward

Central Ward

Chiseldon & Lawn Ward

Covingham & Dorcan Ward

Eastcott Ward

Gorse Hill & Pinehurst Ward

Haydon Wick Ward

Liden, Eldene & Park South Ward

Lydiard & Freshbrook Ward

Mannington & Western Ward

Old Town Ward

Penhill & Upper Stratton Ward

Priory Vale Ward

Rodbourne Cheney Ward

Shaw Ward

St Andrews Ward

Extra vacancy caused by the resignation of Peter Heaton-Jones

St Margaret & South Marston Ward

Walcot & Park North Ward

Wroughton & Wichelstowe Ward

References

2014 English local elections
2014
2010s in Wiltshire